Keyhole was a black-and-white alternative comic book published from 1996 to 1998. A two-man anthology by cartoonists Dean Haspiel and Josh Neufeld, Keyhole was published by two different publishers, starting with Millennium Publications and ending up at Top Shelf Productions. In 2021, Haspiel and Neufeld released a 25th-anniversary issue of Keyhole, with new material from both creators.

Publication history 
Keyhole began as a self-published mini-comic by the long-time friends Haspiel and Neufeld. Keyhole Mini-Comics ran for four issues in 1995. Reviewed in Factsheet Five, Comics Buyer's Guide, and elsewhere, it was then picked up by Millennium, which published the first full-sized issue in June 1996. With its fourth issue, Keyhole was released under Millennium's new imprint, Modern Comics. Top Shelf picked up the comic for its fifth and sixth issues.

In 2002, Haspiel, Neufeld, and Alternative Comics announced plans to publish Keyhole vol. II, but the comic never appeared, and the two cartoonists moved on to other projects.

In the fall of 2021, Haspiel and Neufeld self-published a seventh issue of Keyhole ("Keyhole 25"), a 36-page full-color flip comic with new material from both creators, as well as a center-spread article about the history of the comic, written by Whitney Matheson.

Form and content 
Equally inspired by Harvey Pekar's American Splendor and Los Bros Hernandez' Love and Rockets, a typical issue of Keyhole featured an autobiographical travel story by Neufeld, a Billy Dogma story by Haspiel, and short recurring features such as R. Walker and Neufeld's "Titans of Finance", Neufeld's one-page "Travel Tips" and the Haspiel/Neufeld collaborative feature "Lionel's Lament". Other stories appearing in Keyhole included short autobiographical pieces by Haspiel, and assorted collaborations with other writers (including one memorable piece with The Duplex Planet's David Greenberger).

Legacy 
Although Keyhole only ran six issues, it was a critically acclaimed project which proved to be a launching pad for both Haspiel and Neufeld's careers. The Comics Journal characterized Keyhole this way: "Brought together in a single, independent magazine, these artists' strong, disparate talents create a broad reading experience, and a blending of artistic intentions and personal expression like very few others available today in American comix".

Haspiel debuted his existential antihero, Billy Dogma, in Keyhole, a character whose adventures have since been published by Modern Comics, Top Shelf, Alternative Comics, and Image Comics. In addition, Haspiel collected many of the autobiographical stories from Keyhole in Opposable Thumbs (2001), published by Alternative Comics, and used those stories as a jumping-off point for the Street Code stories he later told on DC Comics' webcomics imprint Zuda Comics.

Neufeld, in turn, collected the "Titans of Finance" stories in a self-titled comic published by Alternative in 2001. In 2004, he collected his Keyhole travel stories (as well as subsequent ones) in the Xeric Award-winning graphic novel A Few Perfect Hours.

In addition, both cartoonists became regular illustrators for Harvey Pekar and his American Splendor projects.

Notes

References 
  (Millennium)
  (Top Shelf)
  (Millennium)
  (Top Shelf)
 Boyd, Robert. "Hit List: Keyhole to Last Gasp Comix & Stories", The Comics Journal #189 (Fall 1997).
 VerBeek, Todd. Review of Keyhole #1-3

External links 
 Keyhole page at Josh Neufeld's website

1996 comics debuts
Comics anthologies
Comics publications
Top Shelf Productions titles